Association Sportive Nyuki is a Congolese football club based in Butembo, North Kivu province.

The club was founded in 1977 and currently playing in the Linafoot, the top level of professional football in DR Congo. 

In 2018, AS Nyuki, has managed to win the Coupe du Congo (DR Congo) for the first time in the club's history.

Honours
Coupe du Congo
 Winners (1): 2018

Performance in CAF competitions
CAF Confederation Cup: 1 appearances
2018–19 – First Round

References

External links

Football clubs in the Democratic Republic of the Congo